Bantia fusca is a species of praying mantis in the genus Bantia in the family Thespidae.

See also
List of mantis genera and species

References

fusca
Insects described in 1911